The Shire of Tambo was a local government area about  east of Melbourne, the state capital of Victoria, Australia.

History

Tambo was first incorporated as a shire on 6 January 1882, splitting away from the Shire of Bairnsdale. On 30 May 1892, it lost three-quarters of its land area when the Shire of Orbost was incorporated. A small amount was re-annexed as Cunninghame Riding on 3 January 1913.

On 2 December 1994, the Shire of Tambo was abolished, and along with the City of Bairnsdale, the Shires of Bairnsdale and Orbost, parts of the Shire of Omeo and the Boole Boole Peninsula from the Shire of Rosedale, was merged into the newly created Shire of East Gippsland.

Wards

The Shire of Tambo was divided into four ridings, each of which elected three councillors:
 Bruthen/Buchan Riding
 Bumberrah Riding
 Coastal Riding
 Cunninghame Riding

Towns and localities

* Council seat.

Population

* Estimate in the 1958 Victorian Year Book.

References

External links
 Victorian Places - Tambo Shire

Tambo